George Southwick may refer to:

 George N. Southwick (1863–1912), American politician in New York state
 George Southwick (Canadian politician) (1808–1891), physician and politician in Canada West